Jordskott ("soil shoot") is a Swedish TV thriller, crime drama series. Police detective Eva Thörnblad (Moa Gammel) investigates the disappearance of her daughter and other mysteries in her hometown of Silverhöjd. The title refers to jordskott, a fictional plant parasite, which enhances one's perceptions but feeds off the host's blood. The series was first broadcast by SVT in 2015. Filming took place in Sala and Ragunda in mid-2014. The series then began broadcasting on ITV Encore in the UK on June 10, 2015, and on Canal+ Seriale in Poland on October 10, 2016.

Following positive reception and strong international sales for the first series, a second series, Jordskott II, followed. It aired from 15 October 2017 in Sweden. It was then screened on ITV Encore in the UK from 19 October onwards and on Shudder in the US from 18 January 2019 onwards.

Plot

The first season of Jordskott is set in mid-2014. Police detective Eva Thörnblad (Moa Gammel), returns to her hometown of Silverhöjd, seven years after her daughter Josefine disappeared beside a forest lake. Josefine's body was never found and local police determined that she had drowned. Upon Eva's return, a local boy has been missing for a week and she looks for similarities between the two disappearances. At the same time, she deals with the death and probate of her late father and his large timber felling, silver mining and processing business, Thörnblad Mineral & Cellulosa.

Eva teams up with Göran Wass (Göran Ragnerstam), a Rikskriminalen detective (and a member of a secret society), and Tom Aronsson (Richard Forsgren), a local detective. They discover that the children's disappearances are inextricably tangled with the conflict between locals, who depend on Thörnblad Mineral & Cellulosa, and mystical beings protecting the forest and surroundings.

In season two, set in early 2017, Eva is back in Stockholm, trying to find missing teenagers and to solve the mystery of a man who dies as he turns to stone. Eva mostly works with Göran and then Tom. The investigations lead into her mother's past as an investigative journalist. The case has connections to Göran's organisation, Envoyés de la Nature (EN) or Nature's Messengers. Eva and Göran find links to changelings at a hospital. Eva also deals with Josefine's absence.

Cast

 Moa Gammel as Eva Thörnblad, a police detective from Stockholm who returns to her hometown of Silverhöjd. Eva later returns to Stockholm.
 Göran Ragnerstam as Göran Wass, a Rikskriminalen detective assigned to investigate the disappearances. He is also a member of a secret society, Envoyés de la Nature (EN) or Nature's Messengers. Note: the actor's daughter,  portrays a nurse in series 1.
  as Tom Aronsson, Silverhöjd senior detective.
  as Ylva, a mystic and isolated woman who lives near Silverhöjd. Her familiar is a raven, Vordur. She later mentors Nicklas
 Ann Petrén as Martina Sigvardsson, the county police commissioner for the Silverhöjd area.
 Mira Gustafsson as Ida Aronsson, Tom's non-verbal young daughter. Generally lives with her mother, Petra in Stockholm.
  as Nicklas Gunarsson, Gerda's mentally disabled son, Eva's half-brother. Later mentored by Ylva.
 Happy Jankell as Esmeralda, young woman with mysterious psychic powers, later travels to Stockholm.
 Gustav Lindh as Jörgen Olsson, a local youth who becomes embroiled in Silverhöjd's mysteries, Eddie's older brother, wants to find Esmeralda.
 Gerhard Hoberstorfer as "Man from EN"/Gabriel Moreaux, Stockholm-based, Göran's EN superior, his motto is "the ends justify the means", Göran disagrees with his harsh methods.
 Louise Ryme as Petra, Tom's ex-wife, Ida's mother, Stockholm resident.
 Yohio as Linus, an androgynous goth teenager, Esmeralda's friend. He later moves to Stockholm.
 Johannes Brost as Pekka Koljonen, Silverhöjd senior doctor, treated Johan, Eva and Josefine.
 Max Vobora as Eddie Olsson, Jörgen's 17-year-old younger brother, interested in Esmeralda, killed by his own knife.
  as Frank Olsson, Jörgen and Eddie's father. Violent and abusive drunkard.
  as Klara, a woman with proficient psychic powers, she later teaches Esmeralda.
 Stina Sundlöf as Forest girl/Josefine Thörnblad, Eva's daughter who was long thought to be dead or missing.
 Amie Vestholm as Josefine (six year-old).

Recurring cast

Series 1 (2015)

 Ville Virtanen as Harry Storm, a mysterious and deadly bounty hunter hired by powerful people. His dog Kuba helps track down targets.
 Lia Boysen as Gerda Gunnarsson, Johan Thörnblad's former secretary and lover, Nicklas' mother.
 Peter Andersson as Gustaf Borén, current CEO of Thörnblad Mineral & Cellulosa.
 Nour El-Refai as Victoria, Silverhöjd police officer.
  as Thomas Leander, Thörnblad Mineral & Cellulosa board member, his son Anton is missing. His other son is Oscar.
  as Jeanette Eriksson, Thörnblad Mineral & Cellulosa board member, Emma's mother.
 Lars-Erik Berenett as Johan Thörnblad, Eva's recently deceased father and former CEO of Thörnblad Mineral & Cellulosa. He was infected by a jordskott – a plant parasite. He supposedly died by suicide in a barn fire.
 Hans Mosesson as Olof Gran, retired Silverhöjd police officer, living in nearby Bräckö.
 Sigrid Johnson as Emma Eriksson, Jeanette's young daughter, later goes missing.
  as Pierre Hedman, Thörnblad Mineral & Cellulosa's lawyer.
 Alba August as Lina. Anton and Oscar's nanny. She is distraught when Anton goes missing.
  as Jeppe Bergman, taxi driver, collects gold jewelry, he is murdered.
  as Borje Dahlqvist, geologist, who is bought off by Gustaf to authorise further blasting in the forest.
  as Ebbe, aged care resident, Jeppe and Tore's brother, collects hats. He is also murdered.
  as Anna-Lena Borén, Gustaf's wife.
  as Silverhöjd forensic pathologist.
 Oskar Thunberg as Holmström, detonation engineer, corrupted by bribes.

Series 2 (2017)

  as Jakob Reisner, head of Eva's Stockholm police unit, a stickler for correct procedure.
 Ana Gil de Melo Nascimento as Bahar Holmqvist, Eva's new colleague in the Stockholm police. Begins to suspect Eva of manipulating evidence.
  as Agneta Thörnblad, Eva's mother, former journalist, now in aged care.
  as Young Agneta, journalist, separated from Johan, Leif's colleague.
 Nikoletta Norrby as Maja Njyman, 14-year-old loner from Silverhöjd, collects insects, befriended by Esmeralda, both travel to Stockholm.
  as "Dr. Parker"/Dante Milles, a criminal suspected of kidnapping teenage girls, former EN member.
  as Zara/Jorun Norrbacka, midwife/neonatal nurse with a mysterious background. Works clandestinely with Dante. Stockholm-based but previously worked in Silverhöjd.
 Nuur Adam as Kalem, an orphaned teenager, African illegal immigrant, befriends Ida. Robin's love interest.
 Rebecka Hemse as Laila Roos, Stockholm forensic pathologist, Jakob's wife, member of EN.
 Eric Ericson as Inge Skyllqvist/Svente Bergwall, new Silverhöjd forensic investigator, Göran's colleague at EN, supports Gabriel's harsh methods. As Svente he posed as an archaeologist.
 Björn Andrésen as "Man under ice"/Leif Cederholm, tortured, desiccated, seeks Zara and Agneta, turned to stone  and dies. 
 Kristoffer Mark Adolfsson as Young Leif, photographer, Agneta's Silverhöjd colleague, and then in Stockholm.
  as Rami Hemalainen, thuggish criminal, involved in human trafficking. Owns a guard dog, Stalin, keeps prisoners at a factory, Silo. Later Rami is found dismembered in Silverhöjd.
 Daniel Atterhagen as Tony Lind, criminal, involved in human trafficking. Commits suicide after arrest.
 Ester Lennstrund as Robin Lundberg, teenager, collects rats, kidnapped and held by Rami. Kalem's love interest.
  as Desirée Lundberg, former figure skater, Robin's mother, dies possibly by suicide.
 Ingela Olsson as Lena Åberg, Eva's aunt, Agneta's sister, married to Roffe, raised teenaged Eva, fosters Kalem.
 Tomas Norström as Roffe, Eva's uncle, married to Lena, building a sauna, fosters Kalem.
  as Stefan, Stockholm forensics specialist in ballistics and DNA profiling.
 Sally Fogelberg Lindberg as Eva (10 year-old), living with Agneta, who becomes increasingly demented.
  as Susie, Stockholm midwife, works alongside Zara.
 Frans Rosengarten as Jesajah, powerful mind reader, EN member, averse to liars.
 Pierre Dahlander as Lasse Björkman, removalist company manager, minor criminal, he worked with but feared Rami.

Episodes

Series 1 (2015)

Series 2 (2017)

Notes

Reception

International reviews were positive and praised the way in which the story was told over the course of the series. The New York Times called Jordskott "a police procedural with elements of contagion thriller and vampire tale," which is arranged "so adroitly that it requires surprisingly little suspension of disbelief." The Irish Examiner enjoyed how the show "slowly starts to weave subtle elements of Norse mythology into the story." The Guardian agreed, writing that the focus on mythology set Jordskott apart from other shows.

References

External links

Official page at Swedish Television. 

Swedish crime television series
2015 Swedish television series debuts
Sveriges Television original programming
Detective television series
Fantasy television series
Television shows set in Sweden
Swedish-language television shows